Aditya Seal  is an Indian actor, best known for his portrayal as a male lead actor in the film Tum Bin II. He made his film debut with Ek Chhotisi Love Story, where he played a teenager opposite Manisha Koirala. He has played roles such as Shekhar Malhotra in Tum Bin II, Sam in Namaste England,  Samuel in Purani Jeans, and Veer Shergill in Fittrat.

Early life and background
Aditya Seal was born in Mumbai to a Bengali father and a Punjabi mother.

He attended Chatrabhuj Narsee Memorial School. Seal is a former taekwondo champion, he is a black belt in taekwondo. He also practices gymnastics and martial arts.

His father produced and acted in a Garhwali film, but Aditya wanted to be a professional cricketer, before an injury aborted the option, so he followed his father's footsteps.

Personal life 
On 21 November 2021, Seal married his longtime girlfriend actress Anushka Ranjan in Mumbai.

Career
Seal made his film debut with Ek Chhotisi Love Story, where he played a teenager voyeur opposite Manisha Koirala. The story revolved around a teenager who becomes secretly obsessed with his neighbor. He also starred in movie We R Friends in 2006.  In Purani Jeans, he played the role of Samuel Lawrence. In 2016, Seal was seen in Anubhav Sinha's Tum Bin II as Shekhar opposite Neha Sharma.

In 2019, he played Manav Randhawa in Student of the Year 2. Next, he portrayed Veer Shergill in Alt Balaji's web series Fittrat opposite Krystle D'Souza, for which he received many accolades.

In 2020, he played Kiara Advani's character's love interest in Indoo Ki Jawani, a dramedy revolving around a girl's adventures with a dating app. The movie was theatrically released on 11 December 2020 amid the 50% occupancy theatrical guideline owing to COVID-19 pandemic in India.

Media 
He was ranked in The Times Most Desirable Men at No. 34 in 2019, and at No. 35 in 2020.

Filmography

Films

Web series

Music videos

Awards and nominations

References

External links

Living people
Bengali people
Punjabi people
1988 births
21st-century Indian male actors
Indian male film actors
Indian male models
Male actors in Hindi cinema
Male actors in Telugu cinema
Indian male taekwondo practitioners